The 2009 World Snooker Championship (also referred to as the 2009 Betfred.com World Snooker Championship for the purposes of sponsorship) was a professional ranking snooker tournament that took place between 18 April and 4 May at the Crucible Theatre in Sheffield, England. This was the first time that the World Snooker Championship had been sponsored by Betfred.

Ronnie O'Sullivan was the defending champion, but he lost in the second round 11–13 against Mark Allen.

John Higgins won his third World title by defeating Shaun Murphy 18–9 in the final. It was Higgins' 20th ranking title.

Tournament summary

First round
 Debutants at the Crucible were Rory McLeod, Martin Gould, Andrew Higginson, and Ricky Walden. They were all defeated in the first round.
 Rory McLeod became the first ever black player at the Crucible.
 Only two out of the sixteen seeded players lost their first round matches. Peter Ebdon lost 5–10 against Nigel Bond, while Joe Perry lost 6–10 against Jamie Cope.
 Steve Davis qualified for the World Championship for a record 29th time, but lost his first round match 2–10 against Neil Robertson.
 In September 2013 Stephen Lee was found guilty of conspiring to lose his first round match 4–10 against Ryan Day, for which as part of other offences Lee received a 12-year ban and was ordered to pay £40,000 in costs.

Second round
Hendry won his 1,000th frame at the Crucible during his match against Ding Junhui. In this very frame Hendry compiled a 140 break. In total, at that moment Hendry had played over 1,700 frames at the Crucible, more than any other player. Hendry went on to win the match 13–10 and qualified for the quarter-finals for a record 18th time. This was the second consecutive year that Hendry had knocked out Ding in the Last 16.
 Mark Allen beat defending champion Ronnie O'Sullivan 13–11. Allen made his best appearance at the tournament, ultimately reaching the semi-finals. This would be the last time that O'Sullivan failed to reach the quarter finals until 2016.
 Neil Robertson won four frames on the final black during the second session of his match with Ali Carter, and went on to win the match 13–8.
 John Higgins beat Jamie Cope 13–12 having trailed 10–12.
 Stephen Maguire and Mark King set a new record for the longest frame ever played at the Crucible at 74 minutes 58 seconds, breaking the previous record of 74 minutes 8 seconds set in the 2006 final between Peter Ebdon and Graeme Dott. 
 The match between Mark Selby and Graeme Dott saw a controversial decision by referee Alan Chamberlain. Dott was going in-off, but stopped the cue ball with his fist before it dropped into the pocket, believing that the in-off was obvious. Chamberlain called a foul and awarded four points to Selby. Convinced that he now had the cue ball in hand, as would be the norm after an in-off, Selby picked up the ball to place it inside the "D". However, Chamberlain then called a foul on him and awarded four points back to Dott. Chamberlain's reasoning was that since the cue ball had never left the bed of the table, Selby should have played the shot from where the cue ball finished. Both players and even members of the audience disputed Chamberlain's decision, but it remained unchanged.

Quarter-finals
 Hendry made the ninth 147 break of his career in the seventh frame of his match against Shaun Murphy. Hendry equalled Ronnie O'Sullivan's record for most 147s and became the second man to score a Crucible 147 more than once, having done it for the first time in 1995.
 Neil Robertson beat Stephen Maguire - who had eliminated him in the second round the year before - 13–8. He became only the second player from Australia in 27 years (since Eddie Charlton) to play a semi-final at the Crucible.
 John Higgins advanced to the semi-finals against Mark Selby by winning his second consecutive match of the tournament in the final frame, again coming from behind before the last frames, this time 11–12. The final frame required two re-racks.
 Mark Allen and Neil Robertson both reached the first world championship semi-finals of their careers.

Semi-finals
Both semi-finals featured impressive comebacks from the eventual losers. Allen came back from a 3–13 deficit against Higgins to 12–15 before losing the match 13–17. In a similar manner, Robertson brought a 7–14 deficit back to 14–14 in his match against Murphy, but lost the final three frames.

Final
 Michaela Tabb made history by becoming the first woman to referee a World Snooker Championship final.
 This was the first final contested by two former world champions since 2003, when Mark Williams defeated Ken Doherty 18–16.
 After the first session ended all-square at 4–4, John Higgins opened up an 11–5 lead over Shaun Murphy, winning the second session 7–1. After the third session, Higgins led 16–8, having won that session 5–3.
 The second frame of the fourth session was Higgins's 1000th frame in the Crucible Theatre.
 The fourth and final session lasted only three frames before John Higgins defeated Shaun Murphy 18–9. In doing so, Higgins became only the ninth player to lift the trophy more than twice, and only the sixth player to have won more than two titles in the modern era (Ray Reardon, John Spencer, Steve Davis, Stephen Hendry and Ronnie O'Sullivan being the others).
 By winning the title two weeks before his 34th birthday, Higgins became the oldest World Snooker Champion since 36-year-old Dennis Taylor in 1985.

Prize fund
The breakdown of prize money for this year is shown below:

Winner: £250,000
Runner-up: £125,000
Semi-final: £52,000
Quarter-final: £24,050
Last 16: £16,000
Last 32: £12,000
Last 48: £8,200
Last 64: £4,600

Stage one highest break: £1,000
Stage two highest break: £10,000
Stage one maximum break: £5,000
Stage two maximum break: £147,000
Total: £1,111,000

Main draw
Shown below are the results for each round. The numbers in parentheses beside some of the players are their seeding ranks (each championship has 16 seeds and 16 qualifiers). The draw for the televised stage of the World Snooker Championship was made on Wednesday, 11 March 2009 at 9:45a.m. GMT on Radio Sheffield.

{{32TeamBracket-Info|paramstyle=numbered
| RD1 = First roundBest of 19 frames
| RD2 = Second roundBest of 25 frames
| RD3 = Quarter-finalsBest of 25 frames
| RD4 = Semi-finalsBest of 33 frames
| RD5 = FinalBest of 35 frames

|18 April| Ronnie O'Sullivan (1)|10| Stuart Bingham|5

|19 & 20 April| Mark Allen (16)|10 | Martin Gould  |6

|21 April| Peter Ebdon (9)|5| Nigel Bond|10 

|22 April| Ryan Day (8)|10| Stephen Lee  |4  

|22 & 23 April| John Higgins (5)|10| Michael Holt  |5

|20 & 21 April| Joe Perry (12)|6| Jamie Cope  |10  

|18 & 19 April| Graeme Dott (13)|10| Barry Hawkins  |8 

|19 & 20 April| Mark Selby (4)|10| Ricky Walden  |6  

|21 & 22 April| Shaun Murphy (3)|10| Andrew Higginson  |8

|20 April| Marco Fu (14)|10 | Joe Swail  |4 

|20 & 21 April| Ding Junhui (11)|10| Liang Wenbo|8

|18 & 19 April| Stephen Hendry (6)|10| Mark Williams |7 

|18 & 19 April| Ali Carter (7)|10 | Gerard Greene  |5

|21 & 22 April| Neil Robertson (10)|10| Steve Davis |2 

|18 & 19 April| Mark King (15)|10| Rory McLeod  |6 

|22 & 23 April| Stephen Maguire (2)|10| Jamie Burnett|5  

|23, 24 & 25 April| Ronnie O'Sullivan (1)|11| Mark Allen (16)|13 

|24 & 25 April| Nigel Bond|5| Ryan Day (8)|13  

|25, 26 & 27 April| John Higgins (5)|13| Jamie Cope |12  

|26 & 27 April| Graeme Dott (13) |10| Mark Selby (4)|13 

|24 & 25 April| Shaun Murphy (3)|13| Marco Fu (14)|3

|23 & 24 April| Ding Junhui (11)|10| Stephen Hendry (6)|13|25, 26 & 27 April| Ali Carter (7)|8| Neil Robertson (10) |13  

|26 & 27 April| Mark King (15)|6| Stephen Maguire (2)|13  

|28 & 29 April| Mark Allen (16)|13| Ryan Day (8) |11

|28 & 29 April| John Higgins (5)|13| Mark Selby (4)|12 

|28 & 29 April| Shaun Murphy (3)|13| Stephen Hendry (6)|11 

|28 & 29 April| Neil Robertson (10)|13 | Stephen Maguire (2) |8

|30 April 1 & 2 May| Mark Allen (16)|13| John Higgins (5)|17 

|30 April 1 & 2 May| Shaun Murphy (3)|17 | Neil Robertson (10)|14

|3 & 4 May| John Higgins (5)|18| Shaun Murphy (3)|9
}}

Preliminary qualifying
The preliminary qualifying rounds for the tournament took place on 25 February 2009 at the English Institute of Sport in Sheffield. (World Professional Billiards and Snooker Association members not on The Tour.)Round 1Round 2Qualifying
The qualifying rounds 1–4 for the tournament took place between 26 February and 4 March 2009 at the English Institute of Sport in Sheffield. The final round of qualifying took place between 8 and 10 March 2009 at the same venue.Round 1Rounds 2–5'''

Century breaks
This is complete list of century breaks scored in both the qualifying and the televised stages.

Televised stage centuries
There were 83 century breaks in the televised stage of the World Championship, a new record beating 2002's and 2007's 68; this record was surpassed in 2015.

 147, 140, 117, 114  Stephen Hendry
 141, 131, 129, 128, 128, 128, 116, 114, 113, 107, 104  John Higgins
 140, 107, 105, 104, 103  Ronnie O'Sullivan
 137, 123, 115, 110, 109, 106, 104, 102, 101, 101  Shaun Murphy
 134, 120, 106  Ryan Day
 133, 127, 122, 115, 101  Stephen Maguire
 130, 121, 112, 111  Ding Junhui
 129, 124, 122, 111  Marco Fu
 129, 119, 119, 115, 108, 108, 106, 103, 103, 103  Mark Allen
 129, 105  Barry Hawkins
 127, 124, 119, 118, 117, 117, 114, 104, 101, 101  Mark Selby
 125, 124, 112, 105, 101  Neil Robertson
 118, 103, 102  Jamie Cope
 117  Graeme Dott
 114  Mark King
 113  Peter Ebdon
 110  Joe Perry
 102  Michael Holt
 100  Stuart Bingham
 100  Ricky Walden

Qualifying stage centuries
There were 69 century breaks in the qualifying stage of the World Championship:

145  Mark Williams
137, 100  Judd Trump
135, 102  Andy Hicks
134, 124, 120, 104  Jimmy White
134, 120, 100  Liang Wenbo
134, 103  Matthew Selt
131  John Parrott
129, 127, 106, 100  Daniel Wells
129  Matthew Couch
128, 103  Ricky Walden
128, 103  Barry Hawkins
127  Michael Holt
127  Rory McLeod
126  David Morris
125, 122, 103  Ian McCulloch
121, 105, 104  Tom Ford
119  Dave Gilbert
117  Mark Davis
117  Jamie Burnett
116  Stefan Mazrocis
116  Ken Doherty
115  Anthony Hamilton
114  Nigel Bond
113, 108, 105, 100  Martin Gould
112, 109  Li Hang
111  Wayne Cooper
110  Stuart Pettman
110  Dominic Dale
109, 101  Lee Spick
109  Aditya Mehta
105, 105  Jin Long
104  Gerard Greene
103  Jamie Cope
102  Scott MacKenzie
102  Jamie Jones
102  Paul Davison
100  Liu Song

References

External links 
 Photos at the BBC
 

World Snooker Championships
World Championship
World Snooker Championship
Sports competitions in Sheffield
April 2009 sports events in the United Kingdom
May 2009 sports events in the United Kingdom